Amadou Soukouna (born 21 June 1992 in Nogent-sur-Marne) is a French football player who plays as a striker and was a French youth international having played at under-19 level.

Career
Soukouna made his professional debut for Toulouse on 13 November 2010 in a league match against Montpellier in a 1–0 defeat. In the following week, he appeared as a first-half substitute in a 1–0 loss to Marseille.

On 7 April 2016, Soukouna signed with Bulgarian club Vereya. In January 2017, he was sold to Levski Sofia where he signed for 2.5 years. On 12 September 2017, he moved to Cherno More as free agent. Soukouna made his debut on 16 September in a 0–1 home defeat against CSKA Sofia, coming on as substitute for Atanas Zehirov. On 9 December 2017, his contract was terminated by mutual consent. In August 2018, Soukouna joined Israeli team Hapoel Petah Tikva, remaining with the club until the end of 2019.
In 2021, Soukouna joined South African club Maritzburg United

References

External links 
 
 
 Profile at Levskisofia.info

1992 births
Living people
French footballers
French expatriate footballers
France youth international footballers
Association football forwards
Toulouse FC players
Luzenac AP players
FC Vereya players
PFC Levski Sofia players
PFC Cherno More Varna players
Hapoel Petah Tikva F.C. players
Hapoel Kfar Saba F.C. players
Ligue 1 players
Championnat National players
First Professional Football League (Bulgaria) players
Liga Leumit players
Israeli Premier League players
Expatriate footballers in Bulgaria
Expatriate footballers in Israel
French expatriate sportspeople in Israel
French expatriate sportspeople in Bulgaria
French people of Malian descent
Sportspeople from Nogent-sur-Marne
Footballers from Val-de-Marne